Tybalmia caeca is a species of beetle in the family Cerambycidae. It was described by Henry Walter Bates in 1872. It is known from Nicaragua, Costa Rica, and Panama.

References

Onciderini
Beetles described in 1872